Gene St. Leon (born c. 1955 in Hutchinson, Kansas) is a retired Champion jockey in American Thoroughbred horse racing.

In 1971 he was among the recipients of the newly created Eclipse Award program when he was voted that year's Outstanding Apprentice Jockey. He was inducted in Calder Race Course Hall of Fame in 1995. During his career he won a record 1,310 races at Calder, a record that stood until it was broken in June 2009 by Eduardo Nunez. St. Leon still holds the Calder record for stakes race wins at 73. 

On February 7, 1976, St. Leon rode Toonerville to a world record time of 1:51 2/5 for one and three sixteenth miles on turf in winning the second division of the Bougainvillea Handicap at Hialeah Park Race Track. 

Gene St. Leon retired from race riding in 1989. He made brief comebacks in 1991 and 1999.

References
 ESPN's list of Eclipse Award winners
 1987 Sports Illustrated article on Gene St. Leon's win in the Alabama Derby

 

1950s births
Eclipse Award winners
American jockeys
Sportspeople from Topeka, Kansas
Living people
Sportspeople from Hutchinson, Kansas